Nannoglottis is a genus of Asian flowering plants in the family Asteraceae.

 Species
 Nannoglottis carpesioides Maxim. - Gansu, Shaanxi, Sichuan, Qinghai
 Nannoglottis delavayi (Franch.) Y.Ling & Y.L.Chen - Sichuan, Yunnan
 Nannoglottis gynura (C.Winkl.) Y.Ling & Y.L.Chen - Qinghai, Sichuan, Tibet, Yunnan, Nepal
 Nannoglottis hieraciphylla (Hand.-Mazz.) Y.Ling & Y.L.Chen - Yunnan 
 Nannoglottis hookeri (Clarke ex Hook.f.) Kitam. - Sikkim, Nepal, Bhutan, Assam
 Nannoglottis latisquama Y.Ling & Y.L.Chen - Vietnam, Sichuan, Yunnan
 Nannoglottis macrocarpa Y.Ling & Y.L.Chen - Tibet
 Nannoglottis qinghaiensis Ling & Y.L.Chen - Qinghai
 Nannoglottis ravida (C.Winkl.) Y.L.Chen - Qinghai, Tibet
 Nannoglottis souliei (Franch.) Y.Ling & Y.L.Chen - Nepal, Tibet
 Nannoglottis yuennanensis (Hand.-Mazz.) Hand.-Mazz. - Yunnan

References

Asteraceae genera
Astereae